Centranthus is a flowering plant genus comprising herbs and subshrubs native to Southern Europe. It is in the family Caprifoliaceae. There are about twelve species in the genus. Some Centranthus are known as introduced species in other parts of the world, including Centranthus ruber in the western United States and Centranthus macrosiphon in Western Australia.

Species include:

Centranthus amazonum Fridlender & A.Raynal 
Centranthus angustifolius (Mill.) DC.  - narrow-leaved valerian
Centranthus calcitrapae (L.) Dufr. 
Centranthus kellereri Stoj., Stef. & T.Georgiev 
Centranthus lecoqii Jord. 
Centranthus longiflorus Steven 
Centranthus macrosiphon Boiss.  - long-spurred valerian
Centranthus nevadensis Boiss. 
Centranthus ruber (L.) DC.  - red valerian
Centranthus trinervis (Viv.) Bég. 
 Centranthus × aurigeranus Giraudias

References

 
Caprifoliaceae genera